is the eighth solo album by Susumu Hirasawa, the first to be completely self-released.

The album was inspired by Myanmar alchemy, and several song names come from Latin terms pertaining to the alchemical magnum opus.

Track listing

Personnel
Susumu Hirasawa - vocals, all instruments, production

technical
Masanori Chinzei - recording, mixing, project management
Keiko Ueda (Pharos) - mastering

visuals
Toshifumi Nakai (Seal/S Floor) - design
Hideki Namai - photography
Kazunori Yoshida - hair & make-up

operations
Teslakite - promotion
Mika Hirano, Rihito Yumoto
Kenji "Sato-ken" Sato (Chaos Union) - executive production

Special Thanks
Hirokazu Tsuchiya (Nikkei netn@avi)
Kasiko Takahasi (Fascination)
Masaru Owaku (A-Shield)
@Nifty Amiga Forum
Atsushi Kakuta
U Khin Maung Aye
Khin May Phue
MJRC
Hirosi Watanabe, Shio Nishikawa, Thaung Htun

Release history

"Rotation (LOTUS-2)" (CD version) is included on the Millennium Actress soundtrack and Music For Movies～World of Susumu Hirasawa Soundtracks compilation.

References

External links
 Philosopher's Propeller
 "Philosopher's Propeller" music video

2000 albums
Susumu Hirasawa albums